Bathyascus is a genus of fungi in the family Halosphaeriaceae. According to a 2008 estimate, the genus contains five species.

References

Sordariomycetes genera
Microascales